Mitch Tropila was a Democratic Party member of the Montana Legislature. He served as a Senator from 2007 to 2013. In 2015 he was elected to the Montana House of Representatives.

External links
Montana Senate - Mitch Tropila official MT State Legislature website
Project Vote Smart - Senator Mitch Tropila (MT) profile
Follow the Money - Mitch Tropila
2008 2006 campaign contributions

Democratic Party Montana state senators
Living people
Year of birth missing (living people)